Leyti N'Diaye (born August 19, 1985 in Dakar) is a Senegalese footballer, who has played for Olympique de Marseille.

Career 
A defender, he joined Olympique de Marseille in 2004 but never managed to get much playing time. He was loaned to Créteil in January 2006 for six months, then loaned again to RC Strasbourg for the 2006–07 season. On 21 July 2009 AC Ajaccio have officially signed N'Diaye on loan from Olympique de Marseille, the defender has spent the last season at Stade Reims.

Playing career
2003–04 : Louhans-Cuiseaux (14 matches)
2004–06 : Marseille (3 matches)
2006 : Créteil (9 matches)
2007–2013 : Marseille (3 matches)

Honours
Marseille
Trophée des Champions: 2010

References

External links
 Marseille bio

Senegalese footballers
1985 births
Living people
Louhans-Cuiseaux FC players
Olympique de Marseille players
RC Strasbourg Alsace players
AC Ajaccio players
US Créteil-Lusitanos players
Stade de Reims players
Ligue 1 players
Ligue 2 players
Footballers from Dakar
Association football defenders